Klaus H. Carl (born 1935) is a German author and photographer, based in North-Rhine-Westphalia.

Early life

Carl attended the ‘Volksschule’ (elementary school) in Cottbus and Bad Hersfeld, and then the convent school of Bad Hersfeld. He spent over ten years in the coal-mining district of Aachen, during which time he completed his studies of the Mining industry as a graduate engineer. He was then employed in the public service, specializing in tunnel mining and construction, and later on in the introduction of IT in administration. Carl simultaneously pursued a career as a lecturer, teacher and mentor, which he continues to this day.

Authorship

Carl first began to write professionally in 1992, when his "Die Kleine PC-Fibel" – an introductory manual to MS-DOS (a precursor to MS-Windows) – was published at R. G. Fischer-Verlag, Frankfurt.

Since 2002, Klaus H. Carl has written and co-written numerous texts accompanied by his own photographs in illustrated books, producing various publications on art, its genres, and its styles.

Photography

In the 1950s, Carl pursued his hobby of photography and he became further involved with the art after transient experiments with various small film formats.

In 1980, and then in 1985, Carl held his first exhibitions in the Düren city library, where he showcased photographs of the great earthquake of Azerbaijan and ‘Landscapes of France’. Throughout the 1990s, his work appeared in exhibitions in Paris, St. Petersburg, Bucharest, and Ho Chi Minh City, granting him a worldwide stage and international exposure. Since 1997, his photographs have featured in the Cities collection of illustrated books at Parkstone International publishing house.

Works

Art Titles

 Athens (2002)
 Dubai (2005)
 Prague (2005)
 Saigon (2003)

Co-Authored Art Titles

 Gothic art (2008)
 Romanesque art (2008)
 Baroque art (2009)
 Rococo (2010)
 1000 Portraits (2014)
 Vienna Secession (2011)
 Gothic art (2011)
 Romanesque art (2011)
 German Painting (2012/2013)

Photographic Exhibitions

 Earthquake in Azerbaijan (1980), City Library Düren
 Landscapes of France (1983), Gallery and Publishing House in Paris
 Landscapes of France (1985), City Library Düren
 Landscapes of France (1989), City Library Düren
 Landscapes of France (1990), exhibitions at various locations in Rhineland
 Landscapes of France (1993), St. Petersburg, then other Russian cities
 Landscapes of France (1995), Regional Tax Office in Cologne
 Landscapes of France (1999), Bucharest
 Landscapes of France (2005), Ho Chi Minh City, Vietnam

References 

 http://www.ortszeitungen.de/rmp/DxMLW?Template=./Templates/idx.tpl&Ort=7&Rubrik=1000004&Art=1281929
 http://www.aachener-nachrichten.de/artikel/1479087
 http://www.aachener-zeitung.de/artikel/1480912
 http://www.hbg-dueren.de/_2008%20Presseclippings.pdf (page 13)
 https://portal.dnb.de/opac.htm?query=%22Klaus+H.+Carl%22&method=simpleSearch
 http://www.vhs.dueren.de/index.php?id=1937&kathaupt=11&knr=E6233C
 https://www.amazon.co.uk/s/ref=ntt_athr_dp_sr_1?_encoding=UTF8&field-author=Klaus%20H.%20Carl&search-alias=books-uk
 http://www.ebooks.com/searchapp/searchresults.net?term=klaus+carl
 http://www.fishpond.co.nz/advanced_search_result.php?rid=74182157&keywords=klaus%20h%20carl
 http://bookshop.blackwell.co.uk/jsp/search_results.jsp;jsessionid=334CF192CAD669474D6854FFE7365508.bobcatp1?wcp=1&quicksearch=1&cntType=&searchType=keywords&searchData=klaus+carl&qs-btn=qs-btn
 http://www.livrariasaraiva.com.br/pesquisaweb/pesquisaweb.dll/pesquisa?ORDEMN2=E&ESTRUTN1=&PALAVRASN1=KLAUS%20CARL
 http://read-and-go.orange.fr/recherche/all/klaus$0020carl/$N/PERTINENCE/1/-1

1935 births
Living people
German non-fiction writers
Photographers from North Rhine-Westphalia
People from Düren
German male non-fiction writers